Michael L. Rosenzweig (born 1941) is a professor of ecology and evolutionary biology at the University of Arizona who has developed and popularized the concept of Reconciliation ecology. He received his Ph.D in zoology at the University of Pennsylvania in 1966 and has gone on to hold a number of positions around the United States.

Rosenzweig has a large body of editorial work spanning from 1977 to present, founding the journals Evolutionary Ecology and Evolutionary Ecology Research as well as the publishing house, Evolutionary Ecology Ltd. with the help of his wife Carole. He has always been committed to the responsibility of disseminating scientific knowledge. An example of his commitment is when the Journal of Evolutionary Ecology was bought out at and the prices were to be raised he stepped down from his editor in chief position and founded Evolutionary Ecology Ltd, which published the journal Evolutionary Ecology Research. He and his wife continue to operate with the responsibility of disseminating knowledge at the forefront of their business.

Rosenzweig also has an impressive number of publications that reach up into the hundreds [8] [9] [10] [11] [12]. His articles cover topics ranging from species diversity to predation dynamics and includes work on environmental issues and public policy. He has published three books on the origins and conservation of species diversity, both for technical and general audiences. He received the Eminent Ecologist Award from the Ecological Society of America in 2008 which is given to a senior ecologist for significant contributions to the field of ecology.

Education 
Ph.D., Zoology: University of Pennsylvania (1966)

Positions 
Professor, Ecology and Evolutionary Biology; University of Arizona (1975–present)

Visiting Professor of Biology: Ben-Gurion University (1981–1982)

Visiting Professor of Zoology: University of Wisconsin (1990–1991)

Associate Professor of Biology: University of New Mexico (1971–1975)

Assistant Professor of Biology: SUNY-Albany (1969–1971)

Visiting Assistant Professor: Cranberry Lake Biological Station, SUNY-Albany (1969)

Assistant Professor of Biology: Bucknell University, Lewisbug, PA, (1965–1969)

Awards 
Ecological Society of America: Eminent Ecologist Award (2008)

Faculty of Science, University of Arizona: Career Teaching Award (2001)

Ninth Lukacs Symp: Twentieth Century Distinguished Service Award (1999)

International Ecological Society: Distinguished Statistical Ecologist (1998)

Udall Center for Studies in Public Policy, University of Arizona: Fellow (1997–1998)

Mountain Research Center, Montana State University: Distinguished Lecturer (1997)

University of Umeå, Sweden: Distinguished Visiting Scholar (1997)

University of Miami: Distinguished Visiting Professor (1996–1997)

University of British Columbia: Dennis Chitty Lecturer (1995–1996)

Iowa State University: 30th Paul L. Errington Memorial Lecturer (1994)

Michigan State University, Kellogg Biological Station: Eminent Ecologist (1992)

Ben-Gurion University of the Negev, Israel: Jacob Blaustein Scholar (1992)

University Wisconsin, Madison: Brittingham Fellow (1990–1991)

Monash University, Melbourne, Australia: The Jock Marshall Fellow (1989)

Australian Academy of Science: The Rudi Lemberg Travelling Fellow (1988–1989)

Society for the Study of Evolution: Vice-President (1988–1989)

Amer Society Zoologists: Outstanding Service Award (1986)

Amer Society Zoologists: Chair, Division of Ecology (1985–1986)

College of Science, University of Arizona: Outstanding Teaching Award (1985)

University of Miami: Distinguished Visiting Professor (1983)

Society for the Study of Evolution: Counselor (1981–1983)

UC San Diego: Distinguished Visiting Scholar (1977)

Editorial Work 
Ecological Society of America: editorial board (1977–present)

Chapman & Hall's services of Population Biology: Editor (1979–1986)

Paleobiology: editor (1983–1986)

Israel Journal of Zoology: Editor (1993-)

Evolutionary Ecology: Founder, Editor-in-chief (1986 – unknown)

Evolutionary Ecology Research: Founder, Editor-in-chief (unknown – present)

Books 
And Replenish the Earth: Harper & Row (1974)

Species Diversity in Space & Time: Cambridge University (1995)

Embracing Nature: Oxford U. Press (Up coming)

Journal Articles 
1986 Z. Abramsky, M.A. Bowers & MLR. Detecting interspecific competition in the field: testing the regression method. Oikos 47:199- 204.

1985 MLR, Z. Abramsky, B. Kotler & W. Mitchell. Can interaction coefficients be determined from census data? Oecologia 66:194-198.

1985 Z. Abramsky, S. Brand & MLR. Geographical ecology of gerbelline rodents in the sand dune habitats of Israel. J. Biogeog. 12:363-372.

1985 Z. Abramsky, MLR & S. Brand. Habitat selection in Israel desert rodents: comparison of a traditional and a new method of analysis, Oikos 45:79-88.

1984 MLR, Z. Abramsky & S. Brand. Estimating species interactions in heterogeneous environments. Oikos43:329-340.

1980 R.J.Frye & MLR. Clump size selection: a field test with two species of Dipodomys. Oecologia 47:323-327.

1978 M. Mares & MLR. Granivory in North and South American deserts. Ecology 59:235-241.

1978 C. Lemen & MLR. Microhabitat selection in two species of heteromyid rodents. Oecologia 33:127-135.

1977 Coexistence and diversity in heteromyid rodents. pp. 89–99 in B. Stonehouse & C. Perrins (eds.), Evolutionary Ecology. Macmillan, London.

1977 M. Mares & MLR. Seeds-seedeater systems. pp. 196–204 in G. Orians & O. Solbrig (eds.), Convergent Evolution in Warm Deserts. Dowden, Hutchinson and Ross, Stroudsburg, PA.

1975 G. Schroder & MLR. Perturbation analysis of competition and overlap in habitat utilization between Dipodomys ordii and Dipodomys merriami. Oecologia 19:9-28.

1975 MLR, B. Smigel & A. Kraft. Patterns of food, space and diversity, pp. 241–268 in Rodents in Desert Environments, I. Prakash & P. Ghosh (eds.), Monographiae Biologicae 28, Dr. W. Junk, the Hague, Netherlands.

1974 B. Smigel, W. Jester, J. Blomgren, K.N. Prasad & MLR. Dietary analysis in granivores through the use of neutron activation. Ecology 55:340-349.

1974 B. Smigel & MLR. Seed selection in Dipodomys merriami and Perognathus penicillatus. Ecology55:329-339.

1974 On the optimal aboveground activity of bannertail kangaroo rats. J. Mamm. 55:193-199.

1973 Habitat selection experiments with a pair of coexisting heteromyid rodent species. Ecology 54: 111-117. 1973 Exploitation in three trophic levels. Amer.Natur. 107: 275-294.

1970 MLR & P. Sterner. Population ecology of desert rodent communities: body size and seed-husking as bases for heteromyid coexistence. Ecology 51:217-224.

1969 MLR & J. Winakur. Population ecology of desert rodent communities: habitats and environmental complexity. Ecology 50:558-572.

2000 National Research Council Environmental Indicators for the Nation. National Academy Press, Washington, DC

1999: with S. Archer, W. Mackay, J. Mott, S.E. Nicholson, M. Pando Moreno, MLR, N.G. Seligman, N.E. West and J. Williams, Arid and semi-arid land community dynamics in a management context, pp. 48–74 inHoekstra, T.W. and M. Shahak, Arid Lands Management: toward ecological sustainability. Univ. of Ill. Press. 279 p.

1996 The Green Commandments, Eco-Health: News & Views 2:4-5

1995 Review: Trees... the green testament, by Y. Kirschen. Restoration and Mgmt. Notes 13:136-7.

1990 Commentary (on ecological uniqueness and loss of species), p. 188-198 in Orians, G., G.M. Brown, Jr., W. E. Kunin & J.E. Swierzbinski (eds.), The preservation and valuation of biological resources. Univ. of Wash. Press, Seattle.

1988 The silly war: religion vs. science. The World and I, Feb:194-197.

1987 Density-dependent habitat selection: a tool for more effective population management, pp. 98–111 in Vincent, T. Y. Cohen, W.J.Grantham, G.P. Kirkwood & J.M. Skowronski (eds.), Modeling &Management of Resources under uncertainty. Springer-Verlag, Berlin.

1974 And Replenish the Earth: the evolution, consequences and prevention of overpopulation. Harper & Row, N.Y. 304 p.

1974 On carrying capacity and U.S. policy, pp. 29–30,85,94,98-99,141 in Proc. Science Advisory Panel of the Committee on Public Works, U.S. House of Representatives, print #93-36, U.S. Government Printing Office, Washington, D.C.

1974 J. Sundquist, B.J.L. Berry, M. Brewer, A. Davis, L. Dworsky, D. McGrath, MLR, J. Sterner & W. Thompson. National population distribution policy, pp. 5–26 in A national public works investment policy. Committee print #93-53 of the Committee on Public Works, U.S. House of Representatives. U.S. Government Printing Office, Washington, D.C.

1974 L. Duhl, A. Davis, J.R. Newbrough, MLR & R. Aldrich. Values and the public works investment policy, pp. 87–105 in Committee print #93-53 (ibid.).

1972 Natural selection and artificial control of human populations, pp. 82–84 in Ecology and Pollution (White, W.W.,Jr. & F.J. Little, eds.). North American Publishing Co., Philadelphia, PA.

2001 The four questions: What does the introduction of exotic species do to diversity? Evolutionary Ecology Research 3 http://www.evolutionary-ecology.com/issues/forthcoming/ar1299.pdf)

2000 Wisheu, I.C., M.L.Rosenzweig, L. Olsvig-Whittaker, and A. Shmida: What makes nutrient-poor mediterranean heathlands so rich in plant diversity? Evolutionary Ecology Research 2: 935-955.

1999 MLR & Y. Ziv: The echo pattern of species diversity: pattern & process. Ecography 22: 614-628.

1999 W. Turner, W. Leitner & MLR: Ws2m; software for estimating diversity. URL: http://eebweb.arizona.edu/diversity

1999 Heeding the warning in biodiversity's basic law. Science 284:276–277

1999 Species diversity, Chapter 9, p. 249-281 in McGlade, J. (ed.), Advanced Theoretical Ecology: principles and applications, Blackwell Science, Oxford, England.

1998 Articles on Species Diversity in Encyclopedia of Ecology and Environmental Management (P. Calow et al., Eds.) Blackwell Scientific Publications Ltd., Oxford, England.

1) Diversity, alpha, beta and gamma: three measures of species diversity in space (p. 195)

2) Diversity gradient: A correlation of diversity with another spatial or temporal variable (p. 195-7)

3) Diversity, methods of measurement and analysis (p. 200)

1998 Preston's ergodic conjecture: the accumulation of species in space and time. Ch. 14 (pp. 311–348) inMcKinney, M.L. & J. Drake (eds.) Biodiversity Dynamics; turnover of populations, taxa and communities. Columbia Univ. Press, NY.

1998 Davidowitz, G. & MLR, The latitudinal gradient of species diversity among North American grasshoppers within a single habitat: a test of the spatial heterogeneity hypothesis. J. Biogeog. 25:553-560.

1997 Tempo and mode of speciation. Science 277:1622–1623.

1997 MLR & E.A. Sandlin: Species diversity and latitude: listening to area's signal. Oikos 80:172-176.

1997 Leitner, W.A. & MLR. Nested species-area curves and stochastic sampling: a new theory. Oikos 79:503-512..

1995 Species Diversity In Space and Time, Cambridge University Press, Cambridge, UK., 436 pp. (Revised ed., 1996) Now in third printing.

1994 MLR & C.W. Clark. Island extinction rates from regular censuses. Conserv. Biol. 8:491-494; reprinted pp. 112–115 in Ehrenfeld, D. (ed.), Readings from Conservation Biology: Genes Populations & Species, 1995, Blackwell Science, Inc. & Society for Conservation Biology, Cambridge, MA

1994 Clark, C.W. & MLR. Extinction and colonization processes: parameter estimates from sporadic surveys. Amer. Natur. 143:583-596.

1993 MLR & Z. Abramsky. How are diversity and productivity related? pp. 52–65 in Ricklefs, R. & D. Schluter (eds.). Species diversity in ecological communities: historical and geographical perspectives. Univ. Chicago Press.

1992 Species diversity gradients: we know more and less than we thought. J. Mamm. 73:715-730.

1992 MLR & S. Vetault. Calculating speciation and extinction rates in fossil clades. Evolutionary Ecology6:90-93.

1984 Z. Abramsky & MLR. Tilman's predicted productivity-diversity relationship shown by desert rodents. Nature 309:150-1.

1980 MLR & J. Taylor. Speciation and diversity in Ordovician invertebrates: filling niches quickly and carefully. Oikos 35:236-243.

1979 MLR & J.L. Duek. Species diversity and turnover in an Ordovician marine invertebrate assemblage, pp. 109–119 in Patil & Rosenzweig ibid.

1978 Competitive speciation. Biol. J. Linnaean Soc. 10:275-289.

1977 On interpreting the results of perturbation experiments performed by nature. Paleobiol. 3:322-324.

1977 Geographical speciation: on range size and the probability of isolate formation. pp. 172–194 in D. Wollkind (ed.), Proc. Wash. State Univ. Conf., Biomath. and Biostatistics, Pullman, WA.

1975 On continental steady states of species diversity, pp. 121–140 in The Ecology and Evolution of Communities, M. Cody & J. Diamond (eds.), Harvard Univ. Press.

2000 Abramsky, Z, M.L. Rosenzweig and A. Subach. The energetic cost of competition: Gerbils as moneychangers. Evol. Ecol. Research 2: 279-292.

1998 Abramsky, Z, M.L. Rosenzweig and A. Subach, Do gerbils care more about competition or predation? Oikos 83:75-84.

1997 MLR & Z. Abramsky, Two gerbils of the Negev: a long-term investigation of optimal habitat selection and its consequences. Evolutionary Ecology 11:733-756.

1997 Abramsky, Z., MLR, J.S. Brown & W.A. Mitchell, Reply to Yom-Tov and Dayan. Oikos78:182.

1995 Ziv, Y., B.P. Kotler, Z. Abramsky & MLR. Foraging efficiencies of competing rodents: why do gerbils exhibit shared-preference habitat selection? Oikos 73:260-268.

1994 Abramsky, Z., O. Ovadia & MLR. The shape of a Gerbillus pyramidum (Rodentia: Gerbillinae) isocline: an experimental field study. Oikos 69:318-326.

1992 Abramsky, Z., MLR & A. Subach, The shape of a gerbil isocline: an experimental field study. Oikos 63:193-199.

1991 Habitat selection and population interactions: the search for mechanism. Amer. Natur. 137:S5-S28.

1991 Chesson, P. & MLR. Behavior, heterogeneity and the dynamics of interacting species. Ecology72:1187–1195.

1991 Abramsky, Z., MLR & B. Pinshow. The shape of a gerbil isocline: an experimental field study using principles of optimal habitat selection. Ecology 72:329-340.

1990 Abramsky, Z., MLR, B. Pinshow, J.S. Brown, B. Kotler & W.A. Mitchell. Habitat selection: an experimental field test with two gerbil species. Ecology 71:2358–2369.

1990 Do animals choose habitats? pp. 157–79 (chapter 8) in M. Bekoff & D. Jamieson (eds.),Interpretation and explanation in the study of animal behavior: comparative perspectives;Interpretation, intentionality and communication. Westview Press, Boulder, CO. (reprinted 1996, pp. 185–199 in M. Bekoff & D. Jamieson (eds.), Readings in animal cognition, MIT Press).

1989 Habitat selection, community organization and small mammal studies. pp. 5– 21 in Morris, D., Z. Abramsky, B. Fox & M.R. Willig (eds.), Patterns in the Structure of Mammalian Communities, International Theriological Congress, Special Publication #28 of the Museum of Texas Tech University Press, Lubbock.

1987 Habitat selection and evolutionary processes, a symposium edited by MLR, vol. 1,(4) ofEvolutionary Ecology, 132 pp.

1987 Habitat selection as source of biological diversity. Evolutionary Ecology 1:315-330.

1987 Editor's coda: central themes of the symposium. Evolutionary Ecology 1:401-407.

1987 Community organization from the point of view of habitat selectors, pp. 469–490 in Gee, J.H.R. & B.J. Giller, (eds.) Organization of Communities: past and present. British Ecological Society Symposium #27, Blackwell Scientific, Oxford. 1986 MLR & Z. Abramsky. Centrifugal community organization . Oikos 46:339-348.

1986 Hummingbird isolegs in an experimental system, Behav, Ecol. and Sociobiol 19:313-322.

1986 J.S. Brown & MLR. Habitat selection in slowly regenerating environments. J. Theor. Biol123:151-171.

1985 S. Pimm, MLR & W.A. Mitchell. Competition and food selection: field tests of a theory.Ecology 66:798-807.

1985 D. Baharav & MLR. Optimal foraging in Dorcas gazelles. J. Arid. Environ. 9:167.

1985 MLR & Z. Abramsky. Detecting density dependent habitat selection. Amer. Natur. 126:405-417.

1985 Some theoretical aspects of habitat selection, pp. 517–540 in Cody, M.L. (ed.), Habitat Selection in Birds, Academic Press, NY

1981 A theory of habitat selection. Ecology 62:327-335.

1981 S. Pimm & MLR. Competitors and habitat use. Oikos 37:1-6.

1979 Optimal habitat selection in two-species competitive systems. Fortschr. Zool. 25:283-293.

1974 On the evolution of habitat selection. Pr. First International Congress of Ecology, pp. 401–404.

1998 Articles on Predation in Encyclopedia of Ecology and Environmental Management (P. Calow, Ed.) Blackwell Scientific Publications Ltd., Oxford, England.

1) Paradox of enrichment (p. 523)

2) Predator-prey interactions (p. 584)

3) Predator satiation, swamping (p. 585)

4) Models of predator-prey interaction (p. 451-3)

5) Prudent predator concept (p. 594)

1997 MLR, Z. Abramsky & A. Subach: Safety in numbers; sophisticated vigilance by Allenby's gerbil. Pr. Nat. Acad. Sci. (USA) 94:5713-5715.

1997 Abramsky,Z., MLR, & A. Subach: Gerbils under threat of owl predation: isoclines and isodars. Oikos78:81-90.

1996 And now for something completely different: Genetic games and Red Queens. Evolutionary Ecology 10:327

1991 MLR & R. McCord. Incumbent replacement: evidence for long-term evolutionary progress.Paleobiology 17:202-213.

1990 Schwinning, S. & MLR. Periodic oscillations in an ideal-free predator-prey distribution. Oikos 59:85-91.

1987 MLR, Joel S. Brown & T.L. Vincent. Red Queens and ESS: the coevolution of evolutionary rates.Evolutionary Ecology 1:59-96.

1978 MLR & W.M.Schaffer. Homage to the Red Queen II. Coevolutionary response to enrichment of exploitation ecosystems. Theor. Pop. Biol. 9:158-163.

1978 W.M. Schaffer & MLR. Homage to the Red Queen I. Coevolution of predators and their victims. Theor. Pop. Biol. 9:135-157.

1977 Aspects of biological exploitation. Quart. Rev. Biol. 52:371-380, reprinted from D. Wollkind (ed.), Proc. Wash. State Univ. Conf., Biomath. and Biostatistics, Pullman, WA. pp. 251–288.

1973 Evolution of the predator isocline. Evolution 27:89-94.

1972 Comment on May & Gilpin, Science 177:904

1972 Stability of enriched aquatic ecosystems. Science 175:564-5.

1971 

1963 MLR & R.H. MacArthur. Graphical representation and stability conditions of predator-prey interactions. Amer. Natur. 97:209-223. Reprinted 1967 by Bobbs-Merrill.

External links
 Faculty Bio
Homepage
 https://web.archive.org/web/20030625031944/http://www.winwinecology.com/
http://www.sciencemag.org/cgi/content/full/300/5625/1508

References 

Living people
American ecologists
University of Arizona faculty
1941 births
Fellows of the Ecological Society of America
Mathematical ecologists